The 2011 Qatar Crown Prince Cup is the 17th edition of the cup tournament in men's football (soccer). It is played by the top-4 teams of the Qatar Stars League after the end of each season.

2011 Participants
 Lekhwiya : 2010–11 Qatar Stars League Champion
 Al-Gharrafa : 2010–11 Qatar Stars League Runner Up
 Al Rayyan Sports Club : 2010–11 Qatar Stars League 3rd Place
 Al-Arabi : 2010–11 Qatar Stars League 4th Place

Bracket

Match details

Semi-finals

Final

References
Goalzz.com

Qatar Crown Prince Cup
2010–11 in Qatari football